John Stoll (13 December 1913 – 25 June 1990) was a British art director. He won an Academy Award in the category Best Art Direction for the film Lawrence of Arabia. During the 1950s, he worked largely on low-budget British feature films.

Selected filmography

 Glad Tidings (1953)
  Flannelfoot (1953)
 What Every Woman Wants (1954)
 The Sleeping Tiger (1954)
 The Crowded Day (1954)
 Radio Cab Murder (1954)
  The Green Carnation (1954)
 The Black Rider (1954)
 The Harassed Hero (1954)
 The Scarlet Web (1954)
 The Happiness of Three Women (1954)
 Where There's a Will (1955)
 Marilyn (1955)
 Keep It Clean (1956)
 Passport to Treason (1956)
 A Touch of the Sun (1956)
 No Road Back (1957)
 West of Suez (1957)
 That Woman Opposite (1957)
 The Camp on Blood Island (1958)
 A Cry from the Streets (1958)
 I Only Arsked! (1958)
 Light Up the Sky! (1960)
 Sword of Sherwood Forest (1960)
 The Greengage Summer (1961)
 Lawrence of Arabia (1962)
 The Running Man (1963)
 Lost Command (1966)

References

External links

1913 births
1990 deaths
British art directors
British film designers
Best Art Direction Academy Award winners
Film people from London